Herta Weissig is a retired German rower who won three medals in the quad sculls at the European championships of 1957–1960, two of them with Gisela Heisse. After retiring from competitions she worked as a rowing coach under the name Herta Weissig-Manger, coaching Angelika Noack, Sabine Dähne, Ute Steindorf, Marita Sandig, Renate Neu, Cornelia Klier, Gerlinde Doberschütz, Silvia Fröhlich, Ramona Kapheim, Ute Stange and Kirsten Wenzel among others.

References

Year of birth missing (living people)
Living people
East German female rowers
European Rowing Championships medalists